Three ships of the Royal Navy have borne the name HMS Montreal, after the Canadian city of Montreal:

  was a 32-gun fifth rate launched in 1761. She was captured by the French in 1779 and subsequently destroyed by the Anglo-French forces at Toulon in 1793.
She was sold in 1832.
  was a schooner serving on the Canadian lakes. She was purchased in 1839 and sold in 1848.

See also
 
 

Royal Navy ship names